The Search for John Gissing is a 2001 comedy film written and directed by Mike Binder, produced by Jack Binder, and starring Alan Rickman, Janeane Garofalo, and Mike Binder, set in London. The film won Best Picture at the 2002 Sarasota Film Festival.

Plot 
Matthew Barnes is a young executive on the move, who finds himself a pawn in corporate in-fighting when he's sent to London to oversee a merger. He's to replace John Gissing. However Gissing gets wind of it, and  makes sure that Matthew and his wife Linda, who has come to England with Matthew, have a miserable first few days there.

Cast
Alan Rickman — John Gissing
Mike Binder  — Matthew Barnes
Janeane Garofalo — Linda Barnes
Sonya Walger — Sister Mary
Juliet Stevenson — Gwyneth Moore
Allan Corduner — Francois "Fuller" Feulliere
Owen Teale— Giles Hanagan
Nigel Terry — Alan Jardeen
Frank Harper — Dexter
James Lance — Donny
Lee Oakes — Carl Gissing
Angela Pleasence — Johanna Frielduct
Tim Briggs — Hotel Clerk
Caroline Holdaway — Gissing's assistant

Response
Not having found an appropriate distribution deal, Sunlight Productions set the film aside following its festival premieres. Shortly thereafter, an online petition was formed in a plea for the release of the film, garnering more than 3,000 signatures. Mike and Jack Binder's Sunlight Productions made the film available online.

Awards and nominations

Awards won
Sarasota Film Festival Film Critics Award: Best Film

Official selection
AFI Fest 2001
Hamptons International Film Festival 2002
Rome Film Festival 2002
Palm Springs International Film Festival 2002
U.S. Comedy Arts Festival Aspen 2002
South by Southwest
Newport Beach Film Festival 2002
Victoria Film Festival 2002
Raindance Film Festival

Releases
This film was released on UK DVD by Simply Media 2 July 2018.

References

External links

Clips at Mike Binder's personal site
Clips, Photos, and Info at the Sunlight Productions official site

2001 films
2001 comedy films
2000s English-language films
American comedy films
Films directed by Mike Binder
Films scored by Larry Groupé
Films set in London
Sunlight Productions films
2000s American films